Darband, formerly a village close to Tajrish, Shemiran, is a neighborhood inside Tehran's metropolitan limits. It is the beginning of a popular hiking trail into Mount Tochal, which towers over Tehran. A chairlift is also available for those not interested in hiking.

The Persian term darband translates to "door of the mountain" (band, a variation of vand and fand, meaning "mountain").

The initial start of the trail at Darband is about 250 metres long and is dotted with a number of small cafes and restaurants. These are quite popular and are busy in the evenings, as locals and tourists alike visit the many hooka lounges along the trail.

The Zahir-od-dowleh cemetery, where many Iranian giants of art and culture such as Iraj Mirza, Forough Farrokhzad, Mohammad-Taqi Bahar, Abolhasan Saba, Ruhollah Khaleqi, Rahi Mo'ayyeri and Darvish Khan are buried, is also located in Darband.

Gallery

References

External links

Encyclopedia Iranica: Darband Quarter

Populated places in Tehran Province
Neighbourhoods in Tehran
Tourist attractions in Tehran